Neskowin  is an unincorporated community in Tillamook County, Oregon, United States, along the Pacific Ocean between Cascade Head and Nestucca Bay. For statistical purposes, the United States Census Bureau has defined Neskowin as a census-designated place (CDP). The census definition of the area may not precisely correspond to local understanding of the area with the same name. The population of the CDP was 134 at the 2010 census, a decrease from 169 at the 2000 census.

Geography
Neskowin is located at  (45.106502, -123.979306).

Demographics

As of the census of 2000, there were 169 people, 94 households, and 47 families residing in the CDP. The population density was 117.3 people per square mile (45.3/km2). There were 408 housing units at an average density of 283.1 per square mile (109.4/km2). The racial makeup of the CDP was 94.08% White, 3.55% Native American, 0.59% Asian, 0.59% from other races, and 1.18% from two or more races. Hispanic or Latino of any race were 2.37% of the population.

There were 94 households, out of which 11.7% had children under the age of 18 living with them, 44.7% were married couples living together, 4.3% had a female householder with no husband present, and 50.0% were non-families. 40.4% of all households were made up of individuals, and 16.0% had someone living alone who was 65 years of age or older. The average household size was 1.80 and the average family size was 2.32.

In the CDP, the population was spread out, with 8.9% under the age of 18, 2.4% from 18 to 24, 17.8% from 25 to 44, 44.4% from 45 to 64, and 26.6% who were 65 years of age or older. The median age was 54 years. For every 100 females, there were 85.7 males. For every 100 females age 18 and over, there were 83.3 males.

The median income for a household in the CDP was $42,000, and the median income for a family was $61,094. Males had a median income of $27,500 versus $61,250 for females. The per capita income for the CDP was $26,576. None of the families and 8.1% of the population were living below the poverty line, including no under eighteens and 15.8% of those over 64.

Natural features
Periodically, remains of an ancient forest, the Neskowin Ghost Forest, are exposed on the beach near Neskowin.

See also
Jerry Zimmerman

References

Census-designated places in Oregon
Unincorporated communities in Tillamook County, Oregon
Seaside resorts in Oregon
Census-designated places in Tillamook County, Oregon
Unincorporated communities in Oregon
Populated coastal places in Oregon